Walker Lake State Recreation Area is a recreation area of Nevada, United States, located on the west shore of Walker Lake. The area was previously protected as a Nevada State Park. It is situated is within the Great Basin, and the Central Nevada Region of the Nevada State Parks system. Walker Lake State Recreation Area is located north of the town of Hawthorne, on U.S. Route 95 in Nevada.

References

External links
Walker Lake State Recreation Area

Protected areas of Mineral County, Nevada
State parks of Nevada
Protected areas of the Great Basin